Russian philosophy includes a variety of philosophical movements. Authors who developed them are listed below sorted by movement.

While most authors listed below are primarily philosophers, also included here are some Russian fiction writers, such as Tolstoy and Dostoyevsky, who are also known as philosophers.

Russian philosophy as a separate entity started its development in the 19th century, defined initially by the opposition of Westernizers, advocating Russia's following the Western political and economical models, and Slavophiles, insisting on developing Russia as a unique civilization. The latter group included Nikolai Danilevsky and Konstantin Leontiev, the early founders of eurasianism. The discussion of Russia's place in the world has since become the most characteristic feature of Russian philosophy.

In its further development, Russian philosophy was also marked by deep connection to literature and interest in creativity, society, politics and nationalism; cosmos and religion were other notable subjects.

Notable  philosophers of the late 19th and early 20th centuries include  Vladimir Solovyev, Vasily Rozanov,  Lev Shestov, Leo Tolstoy, Sergei Bulgakov, Pavel Florensky, Nikolai Berdyaev, Pitirim Sorokin, and Vladimir Vernadsky.

From the early 1920s to late 1980s, Russian philosophy was dominated by Marxism presented as dogma and not grounds for discussion. Stalin's purges, culminating in 1937, delivered a deadly blow to the development of philosophy.

A handful of dissident philosophers survived through the Soviet period, among them Aleksei Losev. Stalin's death in 1953 gave way for new schools of thought to spring up, among them Moscow Logic Circle, and Tartu-Moscow Semiotic School.

Major thinkers

Russian Enlightenment

Vasily Tatishchev (1686–1750)
Gregory Skovoroda (1722–1794)
Mikhail Shcherbatov (1733–1790)
Andrey Bolotov (1738–1833)
Alexander Radishchev (1749–1802)

Slavophiles and pochvennichestvo
Ivan Kireyevsky (1806–1856)
Aleksey Khomyakov (1804–1860)
Vladimir Odoyevsky (1803–1869)
Konstantin Aksakov (1817–1860)
Yuri Samarin (1819–1876)
Fyodor Tyutchev (1803–1873)
Nikolay Danilevsky (1822–1885)
Nikolay Strakhov (1828–1896)
Fyodor Dostoevsky (1821–1881) Religious philosopher artist (see Nikolai Berdyaev)
Konstantin Pobedonostsev (1827–1907)
Konstantin Leontiev (1831–1891)
 Ivan Ilyin (1883–1954)

Russian symbolists
Dmitry Merezhkovsky (1866–1941)
Zinaida Gippius (1869–1945)
Valery Bryusov (1873–1924)
Konstantin Balmont (1867–1942)
Max Voloshin (1877–1932)
Vsevolod Meyerhold (1874–1940)
Alexander Blok (1880–1921)
Andrei Bely (1880–1934)
Vyacheslav Ivanov (1866–1949)
Innokenty Annensky (1855–1909)
Fyodor Sologub (1863–1927)
Georgy Chulkov (1879–1939)

Westernizers
Pyotr Chaadayev (1794–1856)
Nikolai Stankevich (1813–1840)
Vissarion Belinsky (1811–1848)
Alexander Herzen (1812–1870) Father of Russian Socialism

Russian Schellingians
Pyotr Chaadayev (1794–1856)
Dmitry Venevitinov (1805–1827)
Vissarion Belinsky (1811–1848)
Vladimir Solovyov (1853–1900)

Russian positivists
Peter Lavrovich Lavrov (1823–1900)
Grigory Vyrubov (1843–1913)
Nikolay Mikhaylovsky (1842–1910)
Konstantin Kavelin (1818–1885)
Nikolai Korkunov (1853–1904)

Russian Machists
Vladimir Bazarov
Jakov Berman
Alexander Bogdanov (1873–1928)
Sergei Suvorov
Pavel Yushkevich

Russian cosmists

Nikolay Fyodorov (1829–1903) N O Lossky lists Fyodorov as primarily a Christian philosopher.
Nicholas Roerich (1874–1947)
Vladimir Vernadsky (1863–1945)
Konstantin Tsiolkovsky (1857–1935)
Alexander Chizhevsky (1897–1964)
Evald Ilyenkov (1924–1979)
Victor Skumin (1948–)

Occultists
Nikolay Novikov (1744–1818)
Helena Blavatsky (1831–1891)
G. I. Gurdjieff (1872–1949)
P. D. Ouspensky (1878–1947)

Epistemologists, logicians and metaphysicians
 Boris Chicherin (1828–1904)
 S. N. Trubetskoy (1862–1905)

Narodniks
 Alexander Herzen (1812–1870) Father of Russian Socialism
 Nikolai Tchaikovsky (1851–1926)
 Pyotr Lavrov (1823–1900)
 Nikolay Mikhaylovsky (1842–1904)
 Lev Tikhomirov (1852–1923) (later prominent conservative thinker)
 Razumnik Ivanov-Razumnik (1878–1946)

Anarchists
Mikhail Bakunin (1814–1876), qlso listed among the materialist and nihilist theorists
Leo Tolstoy (1828–1910), whom some consider the greatest of Russian novelists
Peter Kropotkin (1842–1921), known as the 'Anarchist Prince' or 'Father of Anarchism'

Materialists and nihilists
N. G. Chernyshevsky (1828–1889)
Dimitri Pisarev (1840–1868)
Ivan Sechenov (1829–1905)

Socialists and Marxists
George Plekhanov (1856–1918) The first major Russian Marxist thinker
Vladimir Lenin (1870–1924) The founder of Leninism
Alexandra Kollontai (1872–1952)
Alexander Herzen (1812–1870)
Leon Trotsky (1879–1940) The founder of Trotskyism
Nikolai Bukharin  (1888–1938)
Sofya Yanovskaya (1896–1966)
Aleksandr Zinovyev (1922–2006)
Evald Ilyenkov (1924–1979)
Aleksandr Voronsky (1884—1937)

Christian philosophers
Pre-Solovyov
 Pamfil Yurkevich (1826–1874)
 Vladimir Solovyov (1853–1900) noted to have created the first complete encompassing system of Russian philosophy
 Vasily Rozanov (1856–1919)
 Fyodor Dostoyevsky (1821–1881) also listed as an existentialist
 Sergei Bulgakov (1871–1944)
 Nikolai Berdyaev (1874–1948) also listed as an existentialist
 Semyon Frank (1877–1955)
 Count Leo Tolstoy (1828–1910) also listed as the greatest of novelists and an anarchist

Orthodox Christian theologians
 Aleksey Khomyakov (1804–1860)
 Pavel Florensky (1882–1937)
 Vladimir Lossky  (1903–1958)
 Georges Florovsky (1893–1979)
 Michael Pomazansky (1888–1988)
 Alexander Schmemann (1921–1983)
 John Meyendorff (1926–1992)

Intuitivist-personalists
 Nikolai Lossky (1870–1965)
 Semyon Frank (1877–1950)
 Aleksei Losev (1893–1988)
 Leo Lopatin (1855–1920)

Existentialists
 Fyodor Dostoyevsky (1821–1881)
 Lev Shestov (1866–1938)
 Nikolai Berdyaev (1874–1948)

Aestheticians
 Alexei Losev (1893–1988)
 Mikhail Bakhtin (1895–1975)
Mikhail Epstein (Epshtein) (1950–)

Historians of thought 
 Isaiah Berlin (1909–1997)
 Razumnik Ivanov-Razumnik (1878–1946)

Globalists
 Alexander Chumakov (1950–)

See also 
 Philosophy in the Soviet Union
 Philosophers' ship
 Russian literature
 Valentin A. Bazhanov
 Lev Gumilev
 Aleksandr Dugin
 Dmitry Likhachev
 Daniil Andreyev
 Vasily Nalimov
 Victor Ovcharenko
 Karen A. Swassjan
 Nicolai A. Vasiliev
 Sergei O. Prokofieff
 Alexander Zinoviev
 Geydar Dzhemal

References

Bibliography
 History of Russian Philosophy (История российской Философии) (1951) by N. O. Lossky. Publisher: Allen & Unwin, London. International Universities Press Inc NY, NY sponsored by Saint Vladimir's Orthodox Theological Seminary.
 A History of Philosophy, Volume 10: Russian Philosophy (1986) by Frederick Copleston. Publisher: Continuum, London.
 A history of Russian Philosophy (2 vols.) by Vasilii Vasilevich Zenkovsky; translator George L. Kline Publisher: Routledge & Kegan Paul (1953).
 Russian Philosophy. English-Russian Dictionary (ed. Vasily Vanchugov). Moscow, People's Friendship University of Russia, 2005.

External links 
 Books on Russian philosophy at Runivers.ru
 Brief overview of Russian philosophy
 PHILTAR—Comprehensive web site with links to texts and resources
 Gallery of Russian Thinkers edited by Dmitry Olshansky
 Russian philosophy—entry in the Internet Encyclopedia of Philosophy.
 Directory of links to Russian philosophers, mostly in Russian
 Routledge entry
 Konstantin Leontiev
 —Extensive collection of links to Bulgakov resources
 Russia's Wisdom by Daniel H. Shubin; a compendium of Russia's philosophers and selections. 

 
Philosophers
Russian